Richard Phillips (born 26 January 1983) is a sprinter from Jamaica. Phillips competed in the 110 metres hurdles at the 2004, 2008 and the 2012 Summer Olympics. He also competed at the 2009 and 2011 World Championships in Athletics. He was born in Kingston.

References

External links

1983 births
Living people
Jamaican male hurdlers
Olympic athletes of Jamaica
Athletes (track and field) at the 2004 Summer Olympics
Athletes (track and field) at the 2008 Summer Olympics
Athletes (track and field) at the 2012 Summer Olympics
Sportspeople from Kingston, Jamaica
Athletes (track and field) at the 2014 Commonwealth Games
World Athletics Championships athletes for Jamaica
Commonwealth Games competitors for Jamaica